The New Zealand Touring Car Championship was a motor racing title which was contested in New Zealand from 1984 to 2002.

Results

See also
 NZ Touring Cars championship

References

Touring car racing series
Auto racing series in New Zealand